Chomp is the second studio album by Athens, Georgia band Pylon, released in 1983. It was re-released in 2009 via DFA Records.

Critical reception
Trouser Press called the album "more ambitious in scope" than the debut, writing that it "incorporates a psychedelic drone in spots." The Stranger deemed Chomp an "essential [record] of angsty new wave and piquant post-punk."

Track listing

Chomp More (2009 reissue – DFA – DFA2220CD)

Track 16 is the B-side of "Beep"/"Altitude" single.

Personnel
Michael Lachowski – bass
Curtis Crowe – drums
Randall Bewley – guitar
Vanessa Briscoe Hay – vocals

References

1983 albums
Pylon (band) albums